
Gmina Wiżajny, is a rural gmina (administrative district) in Suwałki County, Podlaskie Voivodeship, in north-eastern Poland, on the Lithuanian border.

The gmina contains part of the protected area called Suwałki Landscape Park.

Villages
Gmina Wiżajny contains the villages and settlements of Antosin, Bolcie, Burniszki, Cisówek, Dziadówek, Dzierwany, Grzybina, Jaczne, Jegliniszki, Kamionka, Kłajpeda, Kłajpedka, Laskowskie, Leszkiemie, Ługiele, Makowszczyzna, Marianka, Maszutkinie, Mauda, Mierkinie, Okliny, Poplin, Rogożajny Małe, Rogożajny Wielkie, Soliny, Stankuny, Stara Hańcza, Stołupianka, Sudawskie, Sześciwłóki, Użmauda, Wiłkupie, Wiżajny, Wiżgóry, Wysokie and Żelazkowizna.

Neighbouring gminas
Gmina Wiżajny is bordered by the gminas of Dubeninki, Jeleniewo, Przerośl and Rutka-Tartak. It also borders Lithuania.

References
Polish official population figures 2006

Wizajny
Suwałki County